Jordal Amfi (often called  Nye Jordal Amfi) is an indoor ice hockey arena, located in the Jordal district of Oslo, Norway. The 5,300-spectator arena is part of the multi-sports complex Jordal Idrettspark and serves as the home of Eliteserien (ice hockey) side Vålerenga Ishockey.

Construction on the new arena started in January 2017, with completion in September 2020.

History

The 2020 Jordal Amfi is the second ice hockey arena to be built on the site. The first arena was completed in 1951, in time for the 1952 Winter Olympics. In June 2016, the city council of Oslo approved the construction of a new arena on the site. Construction work started in January 2017.

The new arena opened 10 October 2020 with a game in which Vålerenga beat Grüner 4–1.

The arena hosted a EuroBasket 2025 qualification match between Norway and Denmark on 3 July 2022.

See also 
 List of indoor arenas in Nordic countries

References

External links
 

Indoor ice hockey venues in Norway
Sports venues in Oslo
Vålerenga Ishockey
Sports venues completed in 2020
2020 establishments in Norway